Zac Dunn (born 4 February 1991) is an Australian professional boxer and the current WBC International Silver Super middleweight champion and former IBO World champion.

Professional boxing record

|-style="text-align:center; background:#e3e3e3;"
|style="border-style:none none solid solid; "|Result
|style="border-style:none none solid solid; "|Record
|style="border-style:none none solid solid; "|Opponent
|style="border-style:none none solid solid; "|Type
|style="border-style:none none solid solid; "|Rd., Time
|style="border-style:none none solid solid; "|Date
|style="border-style:none none solid solid; "|Location
|style="border-style:none none solid solid; "|Notes
|-align=center
|Win
|27–1
|style="text-align:left;"| Bo Gibbs Jr
|TKO
|6 (10)
|17 November 2018
|style="text-align:left;"| 
|align=left|
|-align=center
|Win
|26–1
|style="text-align:left;"| Enrique Rubio
|TKO
|6 (10)
|27 April 2018
|style="text-align:left;"| 
|-align=center
|Win
|25–1
|style="text-align:left;"| Cedric Spera
|TKO
|4 (10)
|9 Dec 2017
|style="text-align:left;"| 
|-align=center
|Win
|24–1
|style="text-align:left;"| Luis Eduardo Paz
|TKO
|4 (10)
|7 Oct 2017
|style="text-align:left;"| 
|-align=center
|Loss
|23–1
|style="text-align:left;"| David Brophy
|TKO
|7 (12)
|17 Mar 2017
|style="text-align:left;"| 
|align=left|
|-align=center
|Win
|23–0
|align=left| Liam Cameron
|UD
|12
|25 Nov 2016
|align=left|
|align=left|
|-align=center
|Win
|22–0
|align=left| Carlos Adan Jerez
|RTD
|5 (10), 3:00
|1 Jul 2016
|align=left|
|align=left|
|-align=center
|Win
|21–0
|align=left| Les Sherrington
|TKO
|3 (12), 1:52
|30 Apr 2016
|align=left|
|align=left|
|-align=center
|Win
|20–0
|align=left| Rogerio Damasco
|KO
|1 (12), 1:16
|26 Feb 2016
|align=left|
|align=left|
|-align=center
|Win
|19–0
|align=left| Derrick Findley
|SD
|10
|24 Oct 2015
|align=left|
|align=left|
|-align=center
|Win
|18–0
|align=left| Max Bursak
|UD
|12
|27 Jun 2015
|align=left|
|align=left|
|-align=center
|Win
|17–0
|align=left| Beibi Berrocal
|TKO
|2 (12), 2:41
|6 Mar 2015
|align=left|
|align=left|
|-align=center
|Win
|16–0
|align=left| Ricardo Ramallo
|TKO
|7 (12), 1:51
|12 Dec 2014
|align=left|
|align=left|
|-align=center
|Win
|15–0
|align=left| Istvan Zeller
|TKO
|3 (12), 2:10
|11 Oct 2014
|align=left|
|align=left|
|-align=center
|Win
|14–0
|align=left| Yutaka Oishi
|TKO
|4 (12)
|25 July 2014
|align=left|
|align=left|
|-align=center
|Win
|13–0
|align=left| Kyung-Suk Kwak
|KO
|2 (10), 2:10
|16 May 2014
|align=left|
|align=left|
|-align=center
|Win
|12–0
|align=left| Oscar Daniel Veliz
|UD
|10
|21 February 2014
|align=left|
|align=left|
|-align=center
|Win
|11–0
|align=left| Marlon Alta
|TKO
|5 (10)
|29 November 2013
|align=left|
|align=left|
|-align=center
|Win
|10–0
|align=left| Mirko Manquecoy
|TKO
|2 (10)
|21 September 2013
|align=left|
|align=left|
|-align=center
|Win
|9–0
|align=left| Lee Oti
|TKO
|5 (12)
|19 July 2013
|align=left|
|align=left|
|-align=center
|Win
|8–0
|align=left| Fernando Marcos Gonzalez
|KO
|2 (8)
|10 May 2013
|align=left|
|align=left|
|-align=center
|Win
|7–0
|align=left| Mariano Jose Riva
|UD
|8
|8 March 2013
|align=left|
|align=left|
|-align=center
|Win
|6–0
|align=left| Yong Zhang
|TKO
|3 (8)
|30 November 2012
|align=left|
|align=left|
|-align=center
|Win
|5–0
|align=left| Amir Ranjdar
|KO
|1 (8)
|26 October 2012
|align=left|
|align=left|
|-align=center
|Win
|4–0
|align=left| Marlon Toby
|TKO
|2 (8)
|31 August 2012
|align=left|
|align=left|
|-align=center
|Win
|3–0
|align=left| Jonathan Taylor
|TKO
|4 (6)
|21 July 2012
|align=left|
|align=left|
|-align=center
|Win
|2–0
|align=left| Dechapon Suwunnalird
|TKO
|5 (6)
|16 June 2012
|align=left|
|align=left|
|-align=center
|Win
|1–0
|align=left| Marlon Toby
|TKO
|1 (6)
|25 May 2012
|align=left|
|align=left|
|-align=center

Titles in boxing

|-
!colspan="3" style="background:#C1D8FF;"|Regional titles
|-

|-

|-

|-

|-

|-
!colspan="3" style="background:#C1D8FF;"|World titles
|-

|-

|-
!colspan="3" style="background:#C1D8FF;"|Other titles
|-

|-

References

External links
 

1991 births
Living people
Boxers from Melbourne
Australian male boxers
Super-middleweight boxers
International Boxing Organization champions